The Golden Boy is an award that is given by sports journalists to a young male footballer playing in Europe perceived to have been the most impressive during a calendar year (two halves to two separate seasons). All nominees must be under the age of 21 and play in a European nation's top tier. The 2022 edition was won by Barcelona's Gavi. Apart from the main award, an additional one, Golden Boy Web, is decided by online users.

Selection
The prize was established by Italian sports newspaper Tuttosport in 2003. Newspapers that now participate in voting include Bild (Germany), Blick (Switzerland), A Bola (Portugal), l'Équipe (France), France Football (France), Marca (Spain), Mundo Deportivo (Spain), Ta Nea (Greece), Sport Express (Russia), De Telegraaf (Netherlands), and The Times (United Kingdom).  Each juror is allowed to nominate five players, the juror will allocate 10 points to the player that they perceive as the most impressive, 7 for second, 5 third, 3 fourth, and 1 point for fifth most impressive.

Winners

Awards won by position

Awards won by nationality

Awards won by club

Year in bold have shared the win with other clubs.

See also
Bravo Award
Kopa Trophy
Ballon d'Or

Notes

References

European football trophies and awards
Awards established in 2003
Under-21 association football
Association football young player of the year awards
Rookie player awards